East Jefferson General Hospital is a hospital in Metairie, Louisiana (U.S.). The hospital broke ground in 1965 and is still expanding. The facility serves the people of the East Bank of Jefferson Parish.

History 

In 1965, the Jefferson Parish council passed an ordinance for the construction of a hospital service to be built on the East Bank of the Jefferson Parish. East Jefferson General Hospital inaugurated on February 14, 1971. It originally included 250 beds and 250 physicians. The hospital has since expanded adding medical office buildings, the Yenni Treatment Center for outpatient cancer treatment, and the Domino Pavilion (outpatient laboratory and outpatient radiology, as well as same-day treatments). The hospital's primary financial support comes through the EJGH Foundation. The hospital currently includes 420 beds and over 3000 employees (along with more than 650 physicians), making it one of the largest employers in the Parish region.

The hospital is publicly owned and not-for profit, governed by a 10-member volunteer Board of Directors appointed by the Jefferson Parish Council and the Parish President. The hospital is accredited by the Joint Commission on Accreditation of Healthcare Organizations. In 2002, East Jefferson General was the first hospital in Louisiana to receive the Magnet Recognition Program accreditation for nursing excellence. In 2008, EJGH became Louisiana's first hospital to earn affiliate status as a member of the MD Anderson Cancer Network. In 2016, EJGH completed a $2 million renovation of their Breast Care Center. The breast center currently performs over 11,000 mammograms, 3,800 ultrasounds and 500 image guided biopsies each year. In 2020 EJGH became part of LCMC Health in a move that preserved the high quality of care EJGH delivers to the region and was highlighted by a 95% positive vote from the citizens of Jefferson Parish. Key people include Richard Tanzella, CEO,  Raymond DeCorte, M.D. (Chief Medical Officer), Jennifer Sillinsky, M.D. (Chief of Staff).

Departments 
 Cancer Care
 Cardiovascular Services
 Emergency Department
 Neurosciences
 Orthopedics
 Radiology
 Rehabilitative Services
 Stroke Care
 Surgery
 Newborn Services
 Diabetes Management
 Social Services
 Sleep Center
 Pulmonary Services
 Nutrition Services

Hospital branches
 EJGH Extended Hours Kenner
 EJGH Lakeview
 EJGH Primary Care Destrehan
 East Jefferson Imaging Center (EJIC) at Clearview
 East Jefferson Imaging Center (EJIC) at Lakeview
 EJPG Urgent Care – Kenner
 EJ Primary Care – Destrehan
 EJ Primary Care – Kenner
 EJ Cardiology – Kenner
 EJ PT/Rehab – Kenner
 EJ Primary Care – Kenner II
 EJ Primary Care – Lakeview
 EJ OB/GYN – Lakeview
 EJ Spine Care – Lakeview
 EJ Primary Care – Old Metairie
 EJ Primary Care – River Ridge

Awards
 Louisiana in Overall Hospital Care by CareChex
 Louisiana Designated Magnet Hospital by the American Nurses Credentialing Center
 Gold Plus Target Stroke Elite Plus
 One of the top institutions for stroke care by the American Heart Association
 Get With the Guidelines – Heart Failure Silver Plus Achievement Award – Ranked as a top responder to heart failures by the American Heart Association
 AHA EMS: Mission Lifeline Gold Award by U.S. News & World Report
 Award for top spine care by Blue Cross Blue Shield
 2014 Top Performer on Key Quality Measures Recognizes EJGH as one of the top overall hospitals in the country by The Joint Commission
 Regionally Ranked Hospitals –  #3 in Louisiana and #2 in Metro NOLA by U.S. News & World Report
 Rated High Performing in Adult Procedures by U.S. News & World Report for Heart Failure, Hip Replacement and Knee Replacement
 Named #1 Partner in the region in quality by the American College of Radiology
 Cardiac Rehabilitation
 American Association of Cardiovascular and Pulmonary Rehabilitation
 Diabetes Management Center
 Recognized by the American Diabetes Association
 Regional Cancer Center
 American College of Surgeons (ACS) Commission on Cancer
 Rehabilitative Services
 Commission of Accreditation for Rehabilitation Facilities (CARF)
 Pulmonary Rehabilitation
 American Association of Cardiovascular and Pulmonary Rehabilitation

Accreditations
 The Joint Commission – Hospital and Nursing Care Center
 Society of Cardiovasculay Patient Care – Heart Failure Accreditation
 American Academy of Sleep Medicine – Sleep Disorders Program
 American College of Radiology (ACR) – Radiology Oncology Program
 Baby Friendly USA – Baby Friendly Hospital

See also
 List of tallest buildings in Metairie

References

External links
 East Jefferson General Hospital

Hospital buildings completed in 1971
Hospitals in Louisiana